Mohammad Khorramgah (born 23 September 1973) is an Iranian football coach and retired player. He was assistant manager of Esteghlal F.C. in Iran Pro League.

References

1973 births
Living people
Esteghlal F.C. players
Association football defenders
Iranian expatriate footballers
Iranian footballers
Rah Ahan players
Balestier Khalsa FC players
Expatriate footballers in Singapore
People from Sabzevar